Endless Days may refer to:

 "Endless Days" (song), a song by Linda McCartney from the album Wide Prairie
 Endless Days (album), an album by Eberhard Weber